The 2018 Wirral Metropolitan Borough Council election took place on 3 May 2018 to elect members of Wirral Metropolitan Borough Council in England. This election was held on the same day as other local elections.

After the election, the composition of the council was:

Election results

Overall election result

Overall result compared with 2016.

Results by constituency

Birkenhead constituency

Birkenhead consists of the wards of Bidston and St James, Birkenhead and Tranmere, Claughton, Oxton, Prenton and Rock Ferry.

Wallasey constituency

Wallasey consists of the wards of Leasowe and Moreton East, Liscard, Moreton West and Saughall Massie, New Brighton, Seacombe and Wallasey.

Wirral South constituency

Wirral South consists of the wards of Bebington, Bromborough, Clatterbridge, Eastham, and Heswall.

Wirral West constituency

Wirral West consists of the wards of Greasby, Frankby and Irby, Hoylake and Meols, Pensby and Thingwall, Upton, and West Kirby and Thurstaston.

Changes in council composition

Prior to the election the composition of the council was:

After the election the composition of the council was:

Votes summary

Seats summary

Proportionality
The disproportionality of the 2018 election was 7.49 using the Gallagher Index.

Parties and candidates

Contesting political parties

There were in total 96 candidates (down 7 from 2016). As per 2016, both Labour and The Conservative Party contested all 23 seats up for election. The Green Party also stood 23 (up 2), the Liberal Democrats, 22 (up 3) and TUSC, 3 (down 4). UKIP stood 1 candidate (down 8) with 1 Independent also standing.

Policies

Labour Party

Wirral Labour's local election campaign was launched on 10 April 2018 at The Engineering College in Monk's Ferry with the help of the Liverpool City Region Metro Mayor, Steve Rotheram.

Wirral Labour's key priorities were to protect services; work with the police and social services to clamp down on anti-social behaviour and to work with the Metro Mayor to access funds to improve roads and highways.

Wirral Labour received criticism by its own LCF (Local Campaign Forum) for only having one target seat, the Green held ward of Birkenhead and Tranmere. Their campaign in Birkenhead included "Super Saturdays", personal attacks against the Green candidate Pat Cleary and suspected Green voting Labour members put on a list and threatened with suspension. The Greens held the seat with an increased vote share. Other targets were later added.

Conservative Party

The Wirral Conservative's key priorities were to cut spending on consultants and senior directors; abolish country park and coastal area parking charges; scrap the Wirral View newspaper and use the money to reinstate school crossing patrols; scrap plans for food waste bins and instead do more to reduce packaging and plastic waste; ban lending to other councils and scrap plans to build on the Green belt.

Liberal Democrats

The Wirral Liberal Democrat's key priorities were to focus on getting basic services right; secure grants from the government that will recognise Wirral's needs; give local people a greater say, particularly over the Wirral Growth Company; "leave nobody out", particularly in the example of health and social services; make sure money from the sale of council assets is put back into the community; better maintain the road network with more 20 mph zones to improve safety and to scrap the Wirral View.

Green Party

The Wirral Green Party's key priorities were to clamp down on waste and invest more in "key public services"; scrap the Wirral View newspaper and invest savings made in improving the environment; freeze executive pay and introduce measures to address the "obscene pay gap" between the lowest and highest paid council staff; prioritise key brownfield sites for regeneration and housing to end the threat to Wirral's Green belt; transform democratic structures to secure "a more inclusive and transparent council in contrast to the rigid closed shop operated by the Labour Party" and to prioritise investment in active travel with pedestrians, cyclists and cleaner air.

Other parties

The sole UKIP candidate, Paula Walters, was urged to withdraw her nomination by The Labour Party due to a series of "hate-filled" tweets from an account under her name that compared migrants to terrorists.

Retiring councillors

Ward results 

Results compared directly with the last local election in 2016.

Bebington

Bidston and St James

Birkenhead and Tranmere

Bromborough

Clatterbridge

Claughton

Eastham

Greasby, Frankby and Irby

Heswall

Hoylake and Meols

Leasowe and Moreton East

Liscard

Moreton West and Saughall Massie

New Brighton

Oxton

Pensby and Thingwall

Prenton

Rock Ferry

Seacombe

Upton

Wallasey

West Kirby and Thurstaston

Changes between 2018 and 2019

Bromborough by-election 2018

Cllr Warren Ward, elected in 2016, announced his resignation on 9 July 2018. A casual vacancy was announced the next day.

Campaign

On 20 July, Conservative candidate Des Drury sent a printed letter to nearly 1,200 residents about a planning application being approved for the ex-Bromborough Secondary School site that borders the south of the ward. The letter mentions a "More than 1,000" signature strong petition opposing the application. The lead petitioner, who spoke in front of the planning committee when the application was considered on 19 July, was future Labour candidate Jo Bird. This was despite the fact that all 7 Labour councillors on the committee (a majority on the committee as a whole) voted to approve the application.

Upton by-election 2018
Cllr Matthew Patrick, first elected in 2013, announced his resignation on 21 September 2018. He formally resigned on 7 October 2018 with a casual vacancy announced the following day.

Other changes

On 22 February 2019, Moira McLaughlin was announced as leader of an Independent group composed of the three Labour defections.

Notes

• italics denote the sitting councillor • bold denotes the winning candidate

References

2018 English local elections
2018
2010s in Merseyside